Mahir Çayan (15 March 1946 – 30 March 1972) was a Turkish communist revolutionary and the leader of People's Liberation Party-Front of Turkey (Turkish: Türkiye Halk Kurtuluş Partisi-Cephesi). He was a Marxist–Leninist revolutionary leader. On 30 March 1972, he was killed in an ambush by Turkish Military Forces with nine of the other members of THKP-C and THKO in Kızıldere village.

Early life and education
Çayan attended Haydarpaşa High School, then was a scholarship student at Ankara University's School of Political Science.

Politics
While at university, Çayan joined the Workers Party of Turkey and became a leader within the youth movement. Despite this, he frequently clashed with party leadership, which supported the theory of the national democratic revolution. Çayan himself was a anti-revisionist Marxist–Leninist who firmly supported Joseph Stalin. He admired the Guevarist guerrilla groups in Latin America, such as the National Liberation Army, Revolutionary Armed Forces of Colombia, and Tupamaros, and created a strategy called the People's Revolution and the Democratic Revolution. He lashed out at the revisionist lines of the Soviet Union and Workers Party of Turkey and actively supported the Che Guevara and Cuban Revolution, leaving the Workers Party of Turkey in 1965 to form the Revolutionary Youth Federation of Turkey, which developed into the People's Liberation Party-Front of Turkey in 1970. In 1970, he became leader of the People's Liberation Party-Front of Turkey with Ulaş Bardakçı.

Çayan was a Vanguardist and a revolution theorist. He developed the theory of artificial balance which occurs between the oligarchy and the nation during the last crisis of imperialism. He believed the main cause of this contradiction was American imperialism, which developed a Neocolonialism Method after 1946. The goal of this method is to minimize the problems of senior imperialists more satisfactorily, and provides bigger market shares with less expenses, more systematic organization, and no new national wars. The main order is the variance in consolidation of the capital outflow and the transfer. This method leads to "permanent settlement" of imperialism in a country but also raises social production and relative welfare to certain degrees in parallel with an expanding market. As a consequence, contradictions seems less immediate, meaning there is an artificial balance between the anti-order and systemic reactions of the masses, and the oligarchy.

"The Current Situation"
The following was written by Çayan after the declaration of martial law in April 1971:

"The Campaign/Operation in 1950 was a counterrevolution in Turkey, because the usurers and the merchants with the representatives of finance capital came to power. That was the Anatolian Commercial Bourgeoisie which came to power. The “small town compradors” came to power. This parasitical coterie made an alliance with another parasitical coterie like itself and came to power. That was the Dominant Alliance.

The Campaign/Operation on May 27, 1960 was a revolution. The Reformist Bourgeoisie brought another Dominant Alliance to power through overthrow of the feudal residues and the hegemony of usurers and merchants. Why do The Monopoly Bourgeoisie and Imperialism embrace the usurers, the merchants, and the feudal squirearchy without to expel the Reformist Bourgeoisie from the Dominant Alliance? Why do they at least tolerate the taking on the guidance role of the usurers, the merchants, and the feudal squirearchy “team” by the Reformist Bourgeoisie in 1960? and Why do they make an alliance with all these “residues” through to subordinate the Reformist Bourgeoisie? The situation is too clear.

The state in Turkey has never been fallen under the certain hegemony of any coterie of the Bourgeoisie till 1970. The Campaign/Operation in 1919-23 was the campaign of the Reformist Bourgeoisie. The Republic was the state of the Reformist Bourgeoisie, the radicals, the usurers, the merchants, and the wealthy people. The Dominant Alliance made up of all fractions of the Bourgeoisie and the feudal squirearchy. The guidance “power” was the National Bourgeoisie (resp. the Reformist Bourgeoisie). As years passed, the Reformist Bourgeoisie has lost its influence on the economic life under the circumstances of the Monopoly Capitalism and the foreign-dependent elements were taking over. Imperialism has infiltrated widely and based on/referred to the feudal squirearchy, the usurers, and the merchants. The Monopoly Bourgeoisie was getting power step by step.

The Campaign/Operation in 1950 was done. Imperialism has provided full management. The assistance of the Monopoly Bourgeoisie was not the essential “power” at that moment. The “power” was the “team” of the usurers, the merchants, and the feudal squirearchy. The situation of the Monopoly Bourgeoisie was not enough to be a mainstay. The years went by, and it was essential for the interests of Imperialism and Capitalism to “refine” this ally. The Imperialist Relations of Production was consolidating the Monopoly Bourgeoisie. At last, the Campaign/Operation in 1960 was done. Because of the situation of the Monopoly Bourgeoisie, which was not enough to be a main “power”, USA supported the Reformist Bourgeoisie during the revolution. All economic, administrative and social measures of the Reformist Bourgeoisie was going to strengthen the Monopoly Bourgeoisie in the world of 60's anyway. And it was so. Then shortly after, The Reformist Bourgeoisie replaced with the Monopoly Bourgeoisie in 1963. Because of its inability, the Monopoly Bourgeoisie enfranchised and did not refine the Reformist Bourgeoisie. Moreover, the Monopoly Bourgeoisie privileged (but not like before) the team of the usurers and the merchants; so that a strange “administrative balance” was established in the country. We are able to call this phase as the “Comparative Balance Phase” (Turkish: Nispi Denge Dönemi). This “Comparative Balance” is bilateral: 1- Between the Dominant Alliances and the Reformist Bourgeoisie (The Reflection is the Constitution of 1961 and the decisive way/”power” is the Dominant Alliance). 2- Intra-Alliance, between the Monopoly Bourgeoisie and the usurers and the merchants, the decisive way/”power” is the Monopoly Bourgeoisie. So that, Turkish Republic has been an exception among the semi-colonial countries, because no other country has had the same limited democratic rights. Like France, like a “lower level” copy of France. The fifth phase is the Campaign/Operation on March 12, 1971 . That is the end of the Comparative Balance Phase. The Monopoly Bourgeoisie had had full control over the Dominant Alliance..."

Criqiue of Trotskyist Permanent Revolution Theory
"The revolutionary perspective of Marx and Engels in the phase from 1848 until Autumn 1850 is the  permanent revolution. This strategical vision is the result of the misjudgment of the related phase. Based on the great crises ( the global commercial and industrial crises and the agricultural crisis) in 1847, Marx and Engels assumed that “the final hours” of capitalism has come, and the great fight and the age of the socialist revolutions have begun finally. So that means, Marx and Engels thought that the “boomed” global economical crisis of Capitalism in 1847 is the permanent and the last crisis of the system. This theory of Permanent Revolution is the product of the theory of Permanent Crisis.

In the phase of 1847-50, Marx and Engels thought that the proletarian revolution in France and in Europe were going to be in immediate future, therefore they were standing for the leadership of proletariat to do the overdue bourgeois revolution in Germany. In this period, Marx and Engels focused most of their practical and theoretical works on Germany:

“The Communists turn their attention chiefly to Germany, because that country is on the eve of a bourgeois revolution that is bound to be carried out under more advanced conditions of European civilization and with a much more developed proletariat than that of England was in the seventeenth, and France in the eighteenth century, and because the bourgeois revolution in Germany will be but the prelude to an immediately following proletarian revolution”. (Manifesto of the Communist Party by Karl Marx and Frederick Engels February 1848)

Obviously, the Permanent Revolution was the revolution considered for Germany by Marx and Engels. And this Permanent Revolution was not a “stageless” but a “Stagewise” Revolution Theory. Now, this is extremely significant. This is the fundamental property of this theory, which was applied to life in the imperialist epoch by Lenin, that distinguishes itself from the theory of Trotskyist Permanent Revolution. Not only Marx and Engels but also Gottschalk and his supporters have considered the Permanent Revolution for Germany in 1849. But the Permanent Revolution of Gottschalk and his supporters is a “Stageless” or a “One-Stage” Revolution. (Underestimating of the revolutionary potential of the peasants and refusal to make an alliance with proletariat, these are the essences of this theory).

The essence of Trotsky's Permanent Revolution Theory, that he tried to base on Marx, belongs to the vulgar communists Gottschalk and Weitling. That means, the Trotskyist Permanent Revolution Theory is NOT a Marxist Theory."

Death
Çayan and 10 friends abducted three NATO technicians from the Ünye radar station, and demanded that Deniz Gezmiş and his colleagues should not be executed. The group was hiding in a country house in Kızıldere when they were discovered and surrounded by pursuing soldiers. Everyone involved, including the hostages, was killed in the ensuing firefight, except for Ertuğrul Kürkçü.

In culture
Çayan has been referenced in a number of songs, including the Grup Yorum song Sen Olacağız; Grup Adalılar's songs Mahir'i gördüm and Ankara'dan Bir Haber Var; Emekçi's Mahir İle Yoldaşları; Ali Asker's Kızıldere Adın Ahire Kalsın; and Sevinç Eratalay's Mahir'in Türküsü and Mahir Yoldaş. Grup Yorum, Selda Bağcan, Grup Kızılırmak, and Emekçi all have songs titled Kızıldere. Kanbolat Görkem Arslan appears as Çayan in the TV series Hatırla Sevgili. Several books have also been written about him: Mahir by Ali H. Neyzi, Mahir by Turhan Feyizoğlu, and Mahir Çayan'ın Hayatı ve Fikirleri: Bir Devrimcinin Portresi by Tarkan Tufan, among others.

See also
Revolutionary People's Liberation Party/Front

References

External links
 The road to the revolution in Turkey
 The Complete Works of Mahir Çayan

1946 births
1972 deaths
Turkish communists
Stalinism
Anti-revisionists
Turkish revolutionaries
Turkish People's Liberation Party–Front politicians
Workers' Party of Turkey politicians
Guerrillas killed in action
Haydarpaşa High School alumni